Alvah Hunt (c. 1798 Seekonk, Bristol County, Massachusetts – October 28, 1858 New York City) was an American merchant and politician.

Life
He lived at Greene, Chenango County, New York, where he married Anna Birdsall (d. 1878).

He was a member of the New York State Senate (6th D.) from 1839 to 1842, sitting in the 62nd, 63rd, 64th and 65th New York State Legislatures. He was New York State Treasurer from 1848 to 1851, elected on the Whig ticket in November 1847 and re-elected in November 1849. Afterwards he moved to New York City and became Treasurer of the Des Moines Improvement Company.

Sources
 Obit in NYT, on October 29, 1858 (giving wrong location of Seekonk, and wrong year of Treasurer election)
 Political Graveyard
 The New York Civil List compiled by Franklin Benjamin Hough (pages 35f and 142; Weed, Parsons and Co., 1858)
 Chenango County history

1790s births
1858 deaths
New York (state) Whigs
19th-century American politicians
New York (state) state senators
New York State Treasurers
People from Greene, New York
People from Seekonk, Massachusetts